The Lancer 25 PS is an American trailerable sailboat that was designed by Herb David as a motorsailer and first built in 1985. The "PS" designation stands for "Power Sailer".

The Lancer 25 PS has a different hull shape from the Lancer 25 and the Lancer 25 Mark V.

Production
The design was built by Lancer Yachts in the United States, starting in 1985, but it is now out of production.

Design
The Lancer 25 PS is a recreational keelboat, built predominantly of fiberglass, with wood trim. It has a fractional sloop rig, a raked stem, an angled transom, an internally mounted spade-type rudder controlled by a wheel and a fixed fin keel. It displaces  and carries  of ballast.

As a motorsailer, the boat is normally fitted with a large outboard motor.

The design has sleeping accommodation for four people, with a double "V"-berth in the bow cabin around a drop-table and an aft cabin with a transversal double berth. The galley is located on the starboard side just forward of the companionway ladder. The galley is equipped with a stove, icebox and a sink. The head is located opposite the galley on the port side and includes a shower.

See also
List of sailing boat types

References

Keelboats
Motorsailers
1980s sailboat type designs
Sailing yachts
Trailer sailers
Sailboat type designs by Herb David
Sailboat types built by Lancer Yachts